Pony Pony Run Run are a French power pop band from Angers formed in Nantes in 2003. The band line-up consists of three members named simply "G" (Gaëtan Réchin Lê Ky-Huong, guitar/vocals), "A" (Amaël  Réchin Lê Ky-Huong, bass) and "T" (Antonin Pierre, keyboards). Two original members of the group have left the band; "S" (guitar/backing vocals) who left the band in 2008, and "F" (drums) who departed in 2009.

To date, the group have released one studio album and two singles. Their début album, You Need Pony Pony Run Run was released on 8 June 2009 and entered the French albums chart at #104, reaching a peak position of #78 on 12 September 2009. The first song to be taken from the album, "Hey You" was released in September of the same year and reached #8 in Belgium, as well as achieving a position of #19 in the French singles chart.

Discography

Albums

Singles

References

External links

Pony Pony Run Run on Myspace

French pop music groups
Musical groups established in 2003
Musical groups from Pays de la Loire
Musical groups from Angers